Igor de Souza Fonseca (born 19 February 1980), known simply as Igor, is a Brazilian footballer who plays for Portuguese club F.C. Maia Lidador as a forward.

Club career
Born in Maceió, Alagoas, Igor made his professional debut in Portugal, with lowly F.C. Maia of the second division. Subsequently, he played two full seasons in the Primeira Liga, with S.C. Braga and Vitória de Setúbal, contributing four league goals at the former club as they finished fifth and qualified for the UEFA Cup.

Halfway through the 2005–06 Portuguese League campaign, Braga relocated Igor's loan from fellow league team C.F. Estrela da Amadora to Spain's Pontevedra CF, a side in the third level. The Galicians, in turn, after the move was made permanent in summer 2007, loaned the player several times during his contract, and he totalled 26 matches and six goals in division two for Girona FC and Levante UD, before returning to Pontevedra in January 2010 (also had a brief loan spell back in Brazil).

Igor suffered two relegations in 2010–11, one with Pontevedra and the other with CD Tenerife, joining the latter – in the second tier – in January 2011, on loan. In July 2011 he signed with another team in the country, UD Salamanca, moving to the Super League Greece with Panthrakikos F.C. in the summer of 2013 after the club folded.

Personal life
Igor's younger brother, Yuri, was also a footballer and a forward. They shared teams at Maia (where they arrived at a young age) and Pontevedra.

His cousin, Charles, also played several seasons in Spain, and also represented Pontevedra.

Honours
Vitória Setúbal
Taça de Portugal: 2004–05

References

External links

1980 births
Living people
People from Maceió
Portuguese people of Brazilian descent
Naturalised citizens of Portugal
Sportspeople from Alagoas
Brazilian footballers
Portuguese footballers
Association football forwards
Primeira Liga players
Liga Portugal 2 players
Segunda Divisão players
F.C. Maia players
S.C. Braga players
S.C. Braga B players
Vitória F.C. players
C.F. Estrela da Amadora players
Segunda División players
Segunda División B players
Tercera División players
Pontevedra CF footballers
Girona FC players
Levante UD footballers
CD Tenerife players
UD Salamanca players
CD Boiro footballers
Campeonato Brasileiro Série A players
Ipatinga Futebol Clube players
Super League Greece players
Panthrakikos F.C. players
Brazilian expatriate footballers
Expatriate footballers in Portugal
Expatriate footballers in Spain
Expatriate footballers in Greece
Brazilian expatriate sportspeople in Portugal
Brazilian expatriate sportspeople in Spain
Brazilian expatriate sportspeople in Greece